Stadio Pio XII is a multi-use stadium in Albano Laziale, Italy. It is currently used mostly for football matches, and it serves as the home of Albalonga of Serie D and formerly of the Vatican City national football team. The stadium holds 1,500 people.

References

Pio XII
Italy
Buildings and structures in Albano Laziale